Captain Blood, formerly known as Age of Pirates: Captain Blood, is a cancelled action-adventure game based on the novels by Rafael Sabatini about the titular Captain Blood. The player will assume the role of the Captain, following his adventures in 1685 Spanish Main. This game had been rated by the PEGI rating board and was to be released by 1C. The full 1.0 version of the game has been leaked after 10 years of gathering dust and is available on torrent sites. Source code of game engine was released on GitHub under GPLv3 on November 28, 2022.

Gameplay
Captain Blood is a pirate-themed hack and slash action game that featured a mission-based structure, allowing players to fight on both land and sea against hordes of enemies, with ship-to-ship battles and sword fights to gain control of invaded ships. Gamers gain special points as they defeat enemies, acquiring new fighting techniques and gold for weapons and equipment. The game was cancelled because it didn't get the excitement needed to make a considerable buck, and so the idea was scrapped and subsequently cancelled. 

The game was set to be released in 2006 on the Xbox, but was subsequently moved to the seventh generation of consoles.

References

External links
  (archived)
 Age of Pirates: Captain Blood at GameSpot

1C Company games
Cancelled PlayStation 3 games
Cancelled Windows games
Cancelled Xbox games
Cancelled Xbox 360 games
Hack and slash games
THQ games
Video games about pirates
Video games based on novels
Video games developed in Russia